Pauliceia is a municipality located in interior of the state of São Paulo, Brazil. The population is 7,454 (2020 est.) in an area of 374.1 km2. The elevation is 328 m.

History
The settlement Pauliceia was founded by Ezequiel Joaquim de Oliveira on June 29, 1947.
The property was opened in order to locate a city on the banks of the Parana River, for future exchanges with the neighboring state of Mato Grosso (current state of Mato Grosso do Sul).

With the advent of the promulgation of the new Constitutional Charter of the State of São Paulo, which released the creation of new municipalities, especially on the border with other states, the population of the village Pauliceia managed to raise the county, supported by the Organic Law of Municipalities.

Pauliceia was elevated to district and municipality, of lands separated from Gracianópolis (current Tupi Paulista), by Law No. 233 of December 24, 1948. As council was formed with the districts of peace Pauliceia, Panorama and Santa Mercedes. By Law No. 2456 of December 30, 1953, were dismembered Pauliceia of Panorama and the districts of Santa Mercedes. Although the Law No. 233 of December 24, 1948, the municipality was Pauliceia belonging to the county of Lucélia. Was incorporated into the district of Dracena, by Law No. 2456 of December 30, 1953, implemented on 1 January 1954.

Geography 

The municipality contains part of the  Mouth of the Aguapeí Private Natural Heritage Reserve, created in 2010.
On the shores of Paraná River are scenic fishing spots. In addition to the Aguapeí River.

Demographics 

Census Data - 2000
 	
 Total population: 5,302
 Urban: 3,934
 Rural: 1368
 Men: 2,755
 Women: 2,547
 Population density (inhabitants / km ²): 14.14
 Infant mortality 1 year (per thousand): 17.89
 Life expectancy (year): 70.18
 Fertility rate (children per woman): 3.10
 Literacy Rate: 85.52
 Human Development Index: 0.754
 Income: 0.670
 Longevity: 0.753
 Education: 0.838

References

External links 

 Business Guide in Pauliceia (in Portuguese).
 Official home page (in Portuguese).
 Information about the City of Pauliceia (in Portuguese).

Municipalities in São Paulo (state)